Mary Butler (born 29 September 1966) is an Irish Fianna Fáil politician who has served as a Minister of State since July 2020. She has been a Teachta Dála (TD) for the Waterford constituency since 2016. She previously served as Chair of the Committee on Jobs, Enterprise and Innovation from 2016 to 2020.

Political career 
She was the Fianna Fáil junior Spokesperson for Older People and Chair of Oireachtas Cross Party group on Dementia. She had been a member of Waterford City and County Council from 2014 to 2016, before her election to the Dáil in 2016.

Butler was opposed to the legalisation of abortion in Ireland. She called for a No vote in the 2018 referendum on abortion, and co-organised an event calling for a No vote.

Butler put forward a bill in 2018 with the aim of banning tattoos and intimate piercings for people under the age of eighteen; this bill lapsed with the dissolution of the Dáil.

In 2020, she was appointed as Minister of State at the Department of Health with responsibility for Mental Health and Older People.

Canvassing controversy
Former Fianna Fáil TD Brendan Kenneally canvassed for Butler during the 2016 general election campaign, at which she was first elected to the Dáil. Bill Kenneally, a cousin of Kenneally's, was convicted of 1980s sexual abuse of boys, and Kenneally had previously acknowledged that he had been aware of his cousin's crimes before his sentencing to 14 years imprisonment. Butler received criticism for Kenneally's involvement in her 2016 campaign. However, four years later, she again had Keneally canvass for her ahead of the 2020 general election. Kenneally's canvassing for Mary Butler in 2020 became public knowledge when it emerged that he had visited the homes of some of those who had been abused to seek their votes. 

It also emerged that Butler was renting her constituency office from Kenneally, and when it did so, she stated in an interview that she would move elsewhere and did so in early 2020.

Personal life 
Butler is married to Michael, and they have three children. She survived a skin cancer scare in 2022.

References

External links
Mary Butler's page on the Fianna Fáil website

1966 births
Living people
Members of the 32nd Dáil
Members of the 33rd Dáil
Fianna Fáil TDs
Local councillors in County Waterford
Alumni of Waterford Institute of Technology
21st-century women Teachtaí Dála
Ministers of State of the 33rd Dáil
Women ministers of state of the Republic of Ireland